Gumo  is a village in Koderma district of Jharkhand state of India.

References

Villages in Koderma district